Aloisia Kirschner (17 June 1854 – 10 February 1934) was an Austrian novelist, born in Prague and favorably known under her pseudonym Ossip Schubin, which she borrowed from the novel Helena by Ivan Turgenev.

Brought up on her parents' estate at Lochkov, she afterward spent several winters in Brussels, Paris, and Rome, receiving there, undoubtedly, many inspirations for her clever descriptions of artistic Bohemianism and international fashionable society, which were her favorite themes.  An uncommonly keen observer, her great gift for striking characterization, frequently seasoned with sarcasm, is especially apparent in her delineations of the military and artistic circles in Austria-Hungary.

She died in 1934 at Schloss Kosatek, Bohemia.

Works 
Her works are of unequal quality, the earlier being the best.  The more important of her novels and stories include:  
 Ehre (1882; seventh edition, 1893)
 Die Geschichte eines Genies: Die Galbrizzi (1884)
 Unter uns (1884; fourth edition, 1892)
 Gloria Victis (1885; third edition, 1892)
 Erlachof (1887)
 Es fiel ein Reif in der Frühlingsnacht (fourth edition, 1901)
 Asbeïn, aus dem Leben eines Virtuosen (1888; fourth edition, 1901), and its sequel, Boris Lensky (1889; third edition, 1897), probably her most meritorious work
 Unheimliche Geschichten (1889)
 O du mein Oesterreich! (1890; third edition, 1897)
 Finis Poloniœ (1893)
 Toter Frühling (1893)
 Gebrochene Flügel (1894)
 Die Heimkehr (1897)
 Slawische Liebe (1900)
 Marska (1902)
 Refugium peccatorum (1903)
 Der Gnadenschuss (1905)
 Der arme Nicki (1906)
 Primavera (1908)
 Miserere nobis (1910)

External links 
 
 
 
"Our Own Set", review in Neglected Books Page, November 2010

19th-century Austrian novelists
20th-century Austrian novelists
Austrian women novelists
Austro-Hungarian writers
Writers from Prague
1854 births
1934 deaths
20th-century women writers
19th-century Austrian women writers